Microdipoena guttata is a species of true spider in the family Mysmenidae. It is found in a range from the United States to Paraguay.

References

Mysmenidae
Articles created by Qbugbot
Spiders described in 1895